José Angel Molina  (born October 19, 1958) is a retired boxer from Puerto Rico, who competed in the men's light-middleweight division (– 71 kg) during the late 1970s and early 1980s.

He represented his native country at the 1980 Summer Olympics in Moscow, alongside two other boxers: Alberto Mercado and Luis Pizarro. Molina captured the gold medal in the light-middleweight category at the 1979 Pan American Games, defeating USA's James Shuler in the final.

References
 sports-reference

1958 births
Living people
Light-middleweight boxers
Boxers at the 1980 Summer Olympics
Olympic boxers of Puerto Rico
Puerto Rican male boxers
Boxers at the 1979 Pan American Games
Pan American Games gold medalists for Puerto Rico
Pan American Games medalists in boxing
Medalists at the 1979 Pan American Games